The Union of South Africa competed at the 1936 Summer Olympics in Berlin, Germany. 32 competitors, 27 men and 5 women, took part in 26 events in 6 sports.

Medalists

Silver
 Charles Catterall — Boxing, Men's Featherweight

Athletics

Hurdler Sid Kiel, the holder of the South African record for the 110 metres hurdles, was selected in the South African delegation but boycotted to protest the antisemitism of the German government.

Boxing

Cycling

Two cyclists, both men, represented South Africa in 1936.

Individual road race
 Hennie Binneman
 Ted Clayton

Sprint
 Ted Clayton

Time trial
 Ted Clayton

Rowing

South Africa had one rower participate in one out of seven rowing events in 1936.

 Men's single sculls
 Walter Youell

Wrestling

Art competitions

References

External links
Official Olympic Reports
International Olympic Committee results database

Nations at the 1936 Summer Olympics
1936
1936 in South African sport